Asthenosoma marisrubis is a species of sea urchin of the family Echinothuriidae. Their armour is covered with spines. It is placed in the genus Asthenosoma and lives in the sea. Asthenosoma marisrubis was first scientifically described in 1998 by Weinberg & de Ridder.

See also 
 Asthenosoma ijimai
 Asthenosoma intermedium
 Asthenosoma periculosum

References 

marisrubis
Animals described in 1998